Colonae or Kolonai may refer to either of two demoi of ancient Attica:
 Colonae (Antiochis), of the phyle of Antiochis, and later of Antigonis and Ptolemais
 Colonae (Leontis), of the phyle of Leontis